Erich Haenisch  (27 August 1880, Berlin – 21 December 1966, Stuttgart)  was a German sinologist and first-degree cousin of politician Konrad Haenisch. He was the academic teacher of George Kennedy (Yale).

During World War II., Haenisch was the only German sinologist who actively intervened with the Nazi government on behalf of his colleague Henri Maspero, who had been arrested by the Gestapo and taken to Buchenwald, since his son was a member of the resistance. Since Haenisch did not receive support by his German colleagues, he could not save Maspero, who died in Buchenwald on March 17, 1945.

External links
 Erich Haenisch: Sinological Profiles, University of Massachusetts
 

1880 births
1966 deaths
German sinologists
Manchurologists
Mongolists
German male non-fiction writers
Knights Commander of the Order of Merit of the Federal Republic of Germany
Recipients of the Pour le Mérite (civil class)
Writers from Berlin
Members of the German Academy of Sciences at Berlin